A1 is a graphic novel anthology series published by British company Atomeka Press. It was created in 1989 by Garry Leach and Dave Elliott. In 2004 it was restarted, publishing new and old material.

Publication history
The first series (from the late 1980s) comprised six issues, plus the A1 Bikini Confidential. Page-count varied around the 64-128 range. Most stories were one-off showcases, sometimes featuring characters that had publishing history elsewhere (e.g. Concrete, Mr. Monster, Mr. X, the American, Flaming Carrot). "Bricktop" was the one ongoing serialized story, though The Bojeffries Saga by Alan Moore and Steve Parkhouse appeared as self-contained stories in almost every issue. Issue #6 was numbered "6A" and a proposed "6B" never saw print, although most of the stories did see print in other publications, such as Heavy Metal magazine.

In 1992 a second series of A1 appeared under Marvel Comics's Epic Comics imprint, edited by Dave Elliott. These were four 48-page color books featuring work from Dave McKean, Kent Williams, Scott Hampton, George Pratt, P. Craig Russell, Glenn Fabry, Pedro Henry, and many others, including the late Martin Emond.

In 2004 Atomeka started publishing A1 again starting with A1 Big Issue Zero. It featured a Bojeffries Saga story that had originally appeared in two parts in Warrior with an introduction that was produced for the U.S. market to introduce the tone of the material. The new material for that issue was a  strip by Steve Pugh called Shark-Man. Shark-Man eventually had a three issue run in full colour in 2008 published by Image Comics.

Titles

Volume 1

Book 1

 The Big Button, Barry Windsor-Smith
 Warpsmith: "Ghostdance", Alan Moore and Garry Leach
 Deadface: "The Fall of Angels and Other Misfits", Eddie Campbell and Phil Elliott
 Bad Bread, Graham Marks, and John Bolton
 The Ear of Seeing, excerpt from Goethe's Faust, illustrated by John Bartlett-Bolton
 Survivor, Dave Gibbons and Ted McKeever
 The Actress and the Bishop go Boating, Brian Bolland
 Wayfarer: "A Taste of Gold", Paul Behrer and Una Fricker
 Bojeffries: "Festus: Dawn of the Dead", Alan Moore and Steve Parkhouse
 Mr X:
 "Mr X", Bill Sienkiewicz
 "Heartsprings and Watchstops", Neil Gaiman and Dave McKean
 "Prologue Epilogue", Dean Motter
 Libretto, Ted McKeever and Dave Gibbons
 The Return of the Purple Claw - Blazin' Glory No. 5, Oct 1942
 Blazin' Glory: "Ol' Glory, a Tribute", Paris Cullins and Dave Elliott
 Brick Top, Glenn Fabry
 Flaming Carrot: "The Bandit Moons", Bob Burden
 The Hollow Circus, Peter Milligan, Brendan McCarthy and Tom Frame
 Morelli-9: "Lobster Rumpus", Dom Regan

Book 2

Side A

 Big Death, Peter Milligan and David Lloyd
 King Pant, Philip Bond and Jamie Hewlett
 Mr X: "Windows", panels by Nick Abadzis, Mark Badger, Simon Bisley, Brian Bolland, Philip Bond, Bob Burden, Paul Chadwick, Brett Ewins, Mark Farmer, Dave Gibbons, Paul Grist, Jamie Hewlett, John Higgins, Michael Kaluta, David Lloyd, Ted McKeever, Mike Mignola, Kev O'Neill, Paul Rivoche, William G. Simpson, Bryan Talbot, Charles Vess and Matt Wagner
 Bojeffries: "Sex with Ginda Bojeffries", Alan Moore and Steve Parkhouse
 This Really Happened!, Bambos
 A Death on the Beach, Phil Elliott
 Pressbutton: "A Long Time Dead", Pedro Henry and Glenn Fabry
 Morelli-9: "Sperm Warfare", Dom Regan
 Elephant's Graveyard, Raymond Ward, Dougie Braithwaite, and Rex Ward
 Empty Chairs, Graham Marks and John Bolton

Side B

 Mr. Monster, by Michael T. Gilbert and Dave Dorman
 Bricktop: "Firework Night", Glenn Fabry
 Jeepster, by Philip Bond
 Cowboys and Indians, by Al Davison
 Men and Hats, by Barry Windsor-Smith
 Kyrn, by Paul Behrer and Simon Bisley
 Obsessional, by Kevin McManus, Steve Moore and Shawn McManus
 Comics Are Really Grate, by Gary Pleece and Warren Pleece
 Fortean Times, by Steve Moore and Hunt Emerson
 The Talk of Creatures, by Ted McKeever
 Deadface: "About Hermes, Between You and Me", by Eddie Campbell

Book 3

 The American, Mark Verheiden, Dougie Braithwaite, and Chris Warner
 Deadface: "The Bookkeeper From Atlantis", Eddie Campbell
 The Actress and the Bishop throw a Party, Brian Bolland
 My Closest Friend, John Kaiine and Dave McKean
 Leone Ryder, Gary Pleece and Warren Pleece
 Bricktop: "Walton Pig Girls", Chris Smith and Glenn Fabry
 Endless Summer, Philip Bond
 The House of Hearts Desire, Grant Morrison and Dom Regan
 Point of View, Graham Marks and John Bolton
 Bojeffries: "A Quiet Christmas With the Family", Alan Moore and Steve Parkhouse
 Monsieur Mouche: "Lighter than Air", Jean-Luc Coudray and Moebius

Book 4

 Grendel: "Devil's Whisper", James Robinson and D'Israeli
 Hellcity, Alan Martin and Jamie Hewlett
 The Funeral, Andrew Strickland and Richard Barker
 Bricktop: "Balls", Chris Smith and Glenn Fabry
 The Moebius Portfolio (translated by Jean-Marc Lofficier & Randy Lofficier)
 In the heart of the impregnable meta-bunker, Alejandro Jodorowsky and Moebius (see Incal)
 Carnet 3: the Moebius Sketchbook
 Moebius circa '74
 The Last Party on Earth, Jean-Marc Lofficier and Steve Whitaker
 The Day the General Came, James Robinson and Phil Elliott
 Emily, Almost, Bill Sienkiewicz
 Dalgoda: "The Hero of the Tale", Jan Strnad and James Nowlan
 A Lot on his Plate, Graham Marks and John Bolton
 Bojeffries: "Song of the Terraces", Alan Moore and Steve Parkhouse

Book 5

 Cover Story, Neil Gaiman and Kelly Jones
 Bricktop: "Sunglasses", Chris Smith and Glenn Fabry
 In the Penal Colony, Peter Milligan and Brett Ewins (adapted from Franz Kafka)
 The Contact, Brett Ewins and Shaky Kane
 Tor: "Food Chain", Joe Kubert
 Jeff Hawke: "The Devil at Rennes-le-Chateau", Sydney Jordan, Trevor Goring and Thayed Rich
 Knuckles the Malevolent Nun, Cornelius Stone and Roger Langridge
 Bic: "Party Piece", Ed Hillyer
 Reasons, Jeff Jones
 The Boy Who Defied Gravity, Nick Abadzis
 Take One Capsule Every Million Years, Bruce Jones, Jim Sullivan, and William Stout
 Elvistein: "Yin and Yankee", Bambos Georgiu
 The Proxy, Ramsey Campbell and David Lloyd
 Trypto the Acid-Dog: "Pet Sounds", Miguel Ferrer, Bill Mumy, Steve Leialoha
 Kathleen's House, Steve Dillon

Book 6

 Tank Girl: "She's Fucking Great", Jamie Hewlett
 Rescue, Archie Goodwin and D'Israeli
 The Competition, Hilary Barta and Doug Rice
 The Happy Angel of Death, Martin Hand
 'Harlequin Bones: Dada 331, Warren Ellis and Phil Winslade
 'Paris is a Ball, Serge Clerc
 Alec MacGarry: "Obsession", Eddie Campbell
 And They Never Get Drunk But Stay Sober, Garth Ennis and Steve Dillon

Special

 Mr. Monster's Most Wanted!, Michael T. Gilbert
 Parcels of Events, Brian Bolland
 Zirk: "Siren of the Stars", Pedro Henry and Brian Bolland
 Hell City II, Alan Martin and Jamie Hewlett
 Jaremsheela:
 "Chapter I", Steve Moore and David Jackson
 "Chapter II", Steve Moore and David Jackson
 "Chapter III", Steve Moore, Dougie Braithwaite and Dave Elliott
 Tales of the Taco Fiend, Bob Burden
 Click, Melinda Gebbie and Carol Swain
 The Betty Page Portfolio
 Better than a Poke in the Eye with a Sharp Stick, Dave Elliott and William Simpson
 The Temple of Sweat, Peter Milligan and John Higgins
 Bojeffries: "Our Factory Fortnight", Alan Moore and Steve Parkhouse
 Zirk: "The Perils of Polizei", Pedro Henry and Garry Leach

Volume 2

Book 1

 Along for the Ride, Igor Goldkind and Glenn Fabry
 Cyrano de Bergerac's Voyage to the Moon, P. Craig Russell
 Goofing, Scott Hampton
 Fanciable Headcase, ILYA
 Frankenstein Meets Shirley Temple (Part One), Roger Langridge
 Wonderful Life, Steve White

Book 2

 Max Zillion and Alter Ego: "Pawnshop", Hunt Emerson
 Deadline, George Pratt
 Cheeky Wee Budgie Boy: "The Castafiore Affair, Philip Bond and Jon Beeston
 Saccharine Fools, Nick Abadzis
 King Leon (Part One), Peter Milligan and Jamie Hewlett
 Frankenstein Meets Shirley Temple (Part Two), Roger Langridge
 Wonderful Life, Steve White

Book 3

 Axel Pressbutton: "The Movie", by Pedro Henry and Martin Emond
 Pale Horses, Dan Abnett, Steve White and Gary Erskine
 Stripey: "Social Victim Fashion Frenzy", Roddy MacNeil and Colin MacNeil
 King Leon (Part Two), Peter Milligan and Jamie Hewlett
 Frankenstein Meets Shirley Temple (Part Three), Roger Langridge
 Wonderful Life, Una Fricker

Book 4

 King Leon (Part Three), Peter Milligan and Jamie Hewlett
 The Edge, Dave Dorman
 Uptown Ruler, Dave McKean
 Frankenstein Meets Shirley Temple (Part Four), Roger Langridge
 Wonderful Life, Una Fricker

Awards
 1990: Won "Best Anthology" Harvey Award
 1992: Nominated for "Best Anthology" Eisner Award for A1 #5

Notes

References

External links
 Review of A1 issue zero at Comics Bulletin
 Interview with Dave Elliott at the Lottery Party

Defunct British comics